Wagner is a station on Line 1 of the Milan Metro in Milan, Italy. The underground station was opened in 1966 and is located at Piazza Wagner.

History 
The station was opened on 2 April 1966 as part of the section between Pagano and Gambara.

See also 
Piazza Piemonte

References

Line 1 (Milan Metro) stations
Railway stations opened in 1966